Children of Bodom was a Finnish melodic death metal band from Espoo. Formed in 1993 as Inearthed, the final line-up of the group upon their split in 2019 consisted of Alexi Laiho (lead guitar, lead vocals), Jaska Raatikainen (drums), Henkka Seppälä (bass), Janne Wirman (keyboard), and Daniel Freyberg (rhythm guitar). The band released ten studio albums, two live albums, two EPs, two compilation albums and one DVD.

The band's third studio album, Follow the Reaper, was their first album to receive a gold certification in Finland, and subsequent studio albums acquired the same status. Their next four albums debuted at number one on the Finnish album charts, and have also seen chart positions on the United States Billboard 200. They are one of Finland's best selling artists of all time with more than 250,000 records sold there alone.

In 2019, Children of Bodom held their last concert in Helsinki named A Chapter Called Children of Bodom, before disbanding the band. Laiho and Freyberg carried on as Bodom After Midnight in 2020. Laiho, who was one of the founding members of Children of Bodom as well as the only main songwriter, died on 29 December 2020.

History

Formation and early years (1993–1996) 

Children of Bodom was formed in 1993 by guitarist Alexi "Wildchild" Laiho and drummer Jaska Raatikainen under the name of Inearthed. They had known each other since early childhood and had shared an interest in heavy metal, especially death metal groups, such as Dissection, Entombed, Cannibal Corpse, Autopsy, and Obituary and classic metal groups such as Iron Maiden, Judas Priest, Black Sabbath, Metallica, Dio, and Ozzy Osbourne. Bassist Samuli Miettinen completed the initial line-up of the band. Inearthed recorded its first demo, Implosion of Heaven, during August of the same year.

Samuli was the main composer of the band's lyrics for the two years that he took part in Inearthed, but his family moved to the United States in 1995, making it impossible for him to remain in the band. His last contributions to Inearthed were the lyrics of the songs from their second demo, Ubiquitous Absence of Remission which was the first time they worked with producer Anssi Kippo at Astia-studios (Lappeenranta, Finland). In this demo, keyboards were incorporated into the band's songs for the first time. In order to achieve this, both Laiho and Raatikainen played the keyboards separately and subsequently mixed the recorded track with the other instruments. Laiho, who had previously only composed the melodies of the songs, assumed the role of the band's lyricist.

At the time, Raatikainen played French horn in a local big band, and during a rehearsal, he met Alexander Kuoppala, a trumpet player and also a proficient guitarist. Shortly after the recording of their second demo, Kuoppala was invited to join Inearthed as a rhythm guitarist.

The bassist chosen to replace Samuli was Henkka "Blacksmith" Seppälä, whom Laiho and Raatikainen had previously known from school. Apart from playing the bass, Seppälä also often doubles as the band's backing vocalist. Also, the band recruited a musician to specialize on keyboards, whose name was Jani Pirisjoki. Both joined Inearthed in early 1996.

With this new line-up, Inearthed proceeded to record their third demo, titled Shining. This demo did not impress record labels any more than the previous ones had, and none took interest in the band. Despite their efforts, their music got little exposure and managed only to play at local events. As a last resort, the band decided to record an independent, self-funded album.

Laiho wanted to make use of the keyboards more effectively, but Pirisjoki was not attending rehearsals. Thus, he was fired and replaced by a friend of Raatikainen's, a jazz pianist named Janne "Warman" Wirman.

Wirman was the component which was previously missing from Inearthed. His presence allowed the band to assume the style which would later characterize Children of Bodom. With Wirman, the band successfully recorded their first album in 1997. Their debut, Something Wild, was supposed to be released by a small Belgian label, Shiver Records, but second vocalist Sami Tenetz (from Thy Serpent) acquired a copy of their album through the hands of Kuoppala. They both worked for the same company at the time. Shortly after Inearthed signed this contract, Spinefarm Records' boss became interested in signing them for a country-wide release. The latter deal was much more attractive to the band since the Belgian label was offering them close to no help, to the point where they would have to distribute and sell the album themselves.

The band was required to create a new name to sign up to Spinefarm Records. The contract with Shiver records had already been signed under the name of Inearthed. The answer to that problem came as the members looked for good names in their local phone book. When they stumbled upon Lake Bodom, they realized that it was a name with impact and one which had an interesting story behind it. A long list of possible names involving the word Bodom was then made, and they settled with Children of Bodom. The band's name is derived from the Lake Bodom murders.

Something Wild and Hatebreeder (1996–2000)

Something Wild was produced, recorded and mixed by Anssi Kippo and Children of Bodom at Astia-studios (Lappeenranta, Finland). In an attempt to promote their band, they opened a show for Dimmu Borgir in 1997. Their success was such that a representative from the Nuclear Blast label approached them with a contract for a European release, a deal which started on the subsequent year. Something Wild was released in late 1997 in Finland and in 1998 worldwide. In early 1998, for promotional purposes, the band recorded a music video of the song "Deadnight Warrior". The video was directed by Mika Lindberg and had a slim budget of €1000. It made use of simple scenery, which consisted essentially of an outdoors location after a snowstorm. The band played for a couple of hours at night, with an average temperature of minus fifteen degrees Celsius.

Although Laiho is very critical of all of the music he has written, he notes that he dislikes Something Wild the most of all of his albums. When recording this album, Laiho had tried to mimic the style of one of his idols, Yngwie Malmsteen, which is why Something Wild is considered one of the most technical albums Children of Bodom have produced.  Despite this, he still considers it to be their "most important" record, as it "put them on the map."

Children of Bodom's first European tour began in February 1998. They played with bands such as Hypocrisy (at such festivals as Under the Black Sun), The Kovenant and Agathodaimon, but suffered from the absence of Wirman, who was concentrating on finishing his studies. He was replaced by pianist Erna Siikavirta for the duration of the tour.

Months later, the band recorded two new songs again at Astia-studios with producer Anssi Kippo, titled "Towards Dead End" and "Children of Bodom". The latter was included in a compilation by Spinefarm Records, which after being released remained on the top of Finnish charts for eight consecutive weeks. In late August, the band played the song "Forevermore" live for the first time during a show in Russia. This song was later renamed "Downfall".

Their second European tour occurred in September of that same year, but once more Wirman was not able to perform with them. Laiho's then-girlfriend Kimberly Goss (from Sinergy and formerly of Dimmu Borgir, Ancient and Therion) assumed the keyboards this time. By the end of the tour, Kimberly invited Laiho to join Sinergy, which at the time was still in its early stages.

The second album, Hatebreeder, was recorded between the end of 1998 and the beginning of 1999 by Anssi Kippo at Astia-studios (Lappeenranta, Finland). It was originally titled Towards Dead End, but while in studio the members of the band opted for the current title. To create anticipation in Finland, the '"Downfall" single was released two weeks prior to the album's release. It was accompanied by a new music video, once more directed by Mika Lindberg. Hatebreeder ultimately topped the charts in many European countries. In July 1999, the success of the "Downfall" single and Hatebreeder allowed Children of Bodom to schedule three concerts in Japan with Sinergy and In Flames. During two of these concerts, the live album Tokyo Warhearts was recorded. In it the band managed to seamlessly reproduce and at times improve on their songs. At their request, no overdubs were used on the recording of the concert.

Rise to popularity: Follow the Reaper and Hate Crew Deathroll (2000–2004) 

For their next release, Children of Bodom decided to make use of Peter Tägtgren's Abyss studio in Sweden instead of the Finnish Astia-studio from Anssi Kippo where they had recorded all of their previous releases including the demos from Inearthed. The band wrote eight songs for the album. While in the studio, they decided to include an extra track that was hastily composed and featured lyrics improvised by Laiho; that track would eventually receive the name of "Kissing the Shadows". The band gave the album the name of Follow the Reaper and recording sessions took place between August and September 2000; the album saw a worldwide release in late 2000. A music video for "Everytime I Die" was recorded by the Finnish director Tuukka Temonen shortly after.

In February 2002, Children of Bodom began writing songs for their upcoming album, titled Hate Crew Deathroll. They returned to Astia-studio (Lappeenranta, Finland) to work with producer Anssi Kippo again. The session ensued during the months of August and September, and the album was released January 2003 in Finland. It remained on the top of the Finnish charts for a total of three weeks and subsequently became the band's first gold album. Eventually, all of the band's albums reached this status and Follow the Reaper reached platinum.

On 3 January 2003, the Finnish Metal Music Awards were held at Tavastia Club in Helsinki. Voting was open to all the metal fans and was presented through the various media outlets that were working with the event's organizers. Children of Bodom was awarded Finnish Band of the Year.

Children of Bodom's first world tour began in 2003 and lasted until late 2004. The tour had many sold-out concerts and marked the consolidation of the band in North America, but was also accompanied by an unexpected announcement: Kuoppala decided to quit Children of Bodom for personal reasons right in the middle of the tour without giving previous warning. In an interview, when Laiho was asked why Kuoppala left the band, he stated that "Well, I try to be careful about what I say about him because there is no bad blood between us. He told me that he just got sick of touring and the whole band/rock 'n roll lifestyle living in hotels and tour buses and stuff. For me it was really weird because he was always the one who was SO into it! He was a die hard rock 'n roller and suddenly he made a quick 180 turn in his whole life. This whole situation involves a new girlfriend." Griffin's guitarist Kai Nergaard was invited by Laiho to replace Kuoppala, but did not accept the offer. Thus, Alexi's bandmate from Sinergy, Roope Latvala (founding member of Stone, one of the bands which started the heavy metal movement in Finland) assumed the guitars as a session player, until a more permanent solution could be found. This formation was introduced in Moscow on 16 August.

Breakthrough with Are You Dead Yet? (2004–2007) 

After finishing the world tour with Latvala – who then assumed a permanent position in the band's line-up – Children of Bodom proceeded to record and release the EP Trashed, Lost & Strungout and the single "In Your Face", which contained songs from their upcoming album and a parody cover of "Oops!... I Did It Again" by Britney Spears. In late 2005, the album Are You Dead Yet? was released, featuring a style different from what had been presented by the band on its previous works. Simpler and heavier guitar riffs were incorporated into Children of Bodom's sound, as well as elements from industrial music. Reactions from fans to the release were varied; however, the album remains the band's most commercially successful. It was awarded gold status in Finland and reached first place on the Finnish charts, 16th in Germany, 16 in Sweden and 17 in Japan. The next release of the band was a DVD-single for the song "In Your Face", which included the music video, backstage footage from the band and a live recording of the song "Sixpounder" at Wacken Open Air festival in 2004. In June, Children of Bodom was in front of 120,000 spectators, one of their biggest concerts, on the last concert of the Böhse Onkelz. The DVD of the concert, called Vaya Con Tioz, includes Children of Bodom's performance of "Everytime I Die".

Children of Bodom's live DVD Chaos Ridden Years - Stockholm Knockout Live was released on 5 December 2006. It contains a recording of a live concert performed on 5 February 2006 in Stockholm, Sweden, with over 90 minutes of live footage. "Chaos Ridden Years" refers to a documentary featuring interviews with band members about the history of the band and footage of the band on tour. It also contains every music video Children of Bodom has made, except for "Needled 24/7". Guitarist Alexi Laiho was voted world's best guitarist of 2006 by Metal Hammer magazine.

In June 2006, the band embarked on one of their biggest tours: The Unholy Alliance tour, playing alongside Slayer, Lamb of God, Mastodon, In Flames and Thine Eyes Bleed. The bands toured the US through June and July, and Europe through October and November.

On 31 January 2007, Laiho slid down the lane at a bowling alley after accidentally stepping over the foul line. He slammed hard into the wall, breaking his left shoulder. This rendered him unable to play guitar for six weeks. Due to this incident, Children of Bodom was forced to cancel their first 2007 tours, and a festival that they were slated to headline.

On 31 March 2007, the band's website released information on Laiho's condition stating that while Laiho's injury will never fully heal, it no longer affects his ability to play the guitar. The same notice also stated that the band had already written some songs for a new album and would start recording sometime later in 2007.

Blooddrunk and Relentless Reckless Forever (2007–2012) 

From October to December 2007, Children of Bodom recorded their sixth studio album, titled Blooddrunk, which was released on 15 April 2008.
The album contained 10 songs including a cover of "Ghost Riders in the Sky".
Children of Bodom was featured on the Gigantour 2008 North American tour with Megadeth, In Flames, Job for a Cowboy and High on Fire. Children of Bodom was one of the first bands to be confirmed for Wacken Open Air 2008, where they performed alongside many bands including Iron Maiden, Sonata Arctica and Avantasia. Children of Bodom played at Donington Download on 15 June, playing a mixture of old and new songs. On 8 March 2008, Children of Bodom did their first UK signing event at the Zavvi music shop in Oxford Street, London. They signed copies of their new single "Blooddrunk" in CD, 7 inch and 12 inch vinyls, only 666 copies of the 12 inch vinyls have been made.

On 26 June 2008, Children of Bodom played their first show in Auckland, New Zealand with support from local scene acts Dawn of Azazel and Subtract at the Transmission Room. In 2008, Children of Bodom's first three studio albums, as well as Tokyo Warhearts, were remastered and re-released with bonus tracks. In September and October 2008, the band toured the U.S. supporting Blooddrunk with support from The Black Dahlia Murder and Between the Buried and Me. Testament also made a special guest appearance in the main support slot at the tour's New York City date. In November and December 2008, the band toured in Europe supporting Slipknot and Machine Head. From late January to early March 2009, the band also co-headlined the European tour with Cannibal Corpse with Diablo opening for them. On 2 April 2009, Children of Bodom embarked on the No Fear Energy Tour headlined by Lamb of God with main support from As I Lay Dying and themselves, and rotating opening slots with God Forbid and Municipal Waste, but dropped off the tour a week before it was finished following a serious injury Alexi sustained after falling from the top bunk of his tour bus on 26 April 2009, after the show in Palladium Ballroom, Dallas, Texas. In addition to the injury, on 8 May 2009, at Roseland Ballroom in New York City, Alexi and Children of Bodom were forced to quit playing after a few of their songs because of Alexi's previous injury. Laiho originally planned to continue touring despite his injury but was forced to cancel last six dates when any efforts to alleviate the pain failed. All summer festival dates went down as planned and were unaffected by Alexi's injury.

In February 2009, Children of Bodom hinted at plans to release a cover album titled Skeletons in the Closet, which was released on 23 September 2009. They also admitted to being "lazy" when it comes to practicing and talked about plans to have more songs on future albums. The band embarked on a tour of South America and Mexico in September 2009. Support for the trek came from Amorphis. Also in September and October 2009, the band returned to North America to headline a massive month-long tour. On most dates support on the trek came from The Black Dahlia Murder and Skeletonwitch. Austrian Death Machine and Holy Grail made a special guest appearance in the main support slot at the tour's second Pomona, California date. On October 18, 2009, four days after the band's North American tour finale in Honolulu, Hawaii they performed at Japan's Loudpark Festival along with Megadeth, Judas Priest, Slayer, Anthrax, Rob Zombie and Arch Enemy. In the six days following their performance at the Loudpark Festival, they held three shows in Hong Kong, Taiwan and China respectively. They finished their two-month September to October tour in Moscow, Russia. This concluded their year and a half long Blooddrunk World Tour.

Skeletons in the Closet is a cover album released on 22 September 2009. It features covers released on versions of previous albums but also includes four new tracks. Covered artists include Suicidal Tendencies, Britney Spears, Alice Cooper, Iron Maiden, Slayer, Andrew WK, Billy Idol and Scorpions

Children of Bodom featured a contest to promote their new album in which anyone could win prizes featuring an ESP/LTD M-53 electric guitar, the band's entire back catalog, and Skeletons in the Closet. The contest ran from 25 August to 21 September 2009. The winners were announced 28 September 2009.

Return to form with Halo of Blood (2010–2014) 
After the Blooddrunk tour ended, Children of Bodom started recording their new album. During the recording of the drum tracks there was a small tornado and the power was cut out. Consequently, the recording was delayed until after their tour with Black Label Society. Children of Bodom released some information to Metal Hammer magazine about new album tracks. The three tracks they released were titled "Pussyfoot Miss Suicide", "Ugly", and "Was It Worth It?"

In November the band announced "The Ugly World Tour 2011" which would run from March–May 2011 and would feature dates around Europe. Opening Acts were Ensiferum, Machinae Supremacy and Amon Amarth (UK only). On 24 November, it was announced that the title of the album would be Relentless Reckless Forever. The album was released on 8 March 2011. A music video for "Was It Worth It?" was produced, featuring skateboarder Chris Cole as well as noted pro skaters Jamie Thomas, Garrett Hill and Tom Asta. "Was It Worth It?" was released as a downloadable track for the video game Guitar Hero: Warriors of Rock in February 2011.

Halo of Blood is the band's eighth studio album. It was released on 6 June in Europe, 10 June in the United Kingdom and on 11 June in North America. The Mayhem Festival tour alongside Rob Zombie, Mastodon and Amon Amarth was also announced on 18 March 2013.

Music journalist Neil Kelly of PopMatters said in praise of the album, "Death metal could very well re-enter mainstream consciousness through Halo of Blood, the most accessible Children of Bodom release yet."

In May 2014, the band toured eastern Australia, visiting Brisbane, Sydney and Melbourne with Eye of the Enemy as support, along with Orpheus Omega in Melbourne, and Emergency Gate in Brisbane and Sydney.

I Worship Chaos, Hexed and final show (2014–2019) 

On 7 April 2015, the band announced that they have begun working on the follow-up of Halo of Blood. On 29 May 2015, the band announced on their Facebook page that Roope Latvala is no longer part of Children of Bodom with the new album to be recorded as a four-piece for the first time. However, the band later updated that Latvala's part in the band will be filled in by Antti Wirman, keyboardist Janne Wirman's younger brother for live commitments until the end of the year; he debuted with the band in a private live show in Helsinki. In a later interview with Wirman, he stated that his brother would not join the band permanently. On 8 June 2015, the album title was announced as I Worship Chaos and was released through Nuclear Blast on 2 October 2015. On 19 January 2016, the band announced the addition of Daniel Freyberg on guitar. He would make his live debut with them in Tampa, Florida on 9 February.

In an interview with Noizr Zine, taken on September 14, 2017, Children of Bodom's keyboardist Janne Wirman answering to the question about the band's plans to start working on a new album with "the same production team" (Mikko Karmila and Mika Jussila) after '20 Years Down & Dirty' tour ends, said the following: "Yes, I think we are. And we're going to record it in our warehouse."  In November 2017, Bassist Henkka Seppälä discussed in an interview that the band have half an album's worth of material written for the next album.  They began to start recording the new album in March 2018. In August 2018, Seppälä stated in an interview with TotalRock Radio that the album will be released in early 2019.  In November 2018, the band revealed that the album would be called Hexed. It was released on 8 March 2019.

On November 1, 2019, it was announced that Children of Bodom would play their final show with the line-up at the time on December 15. The gig, dubbed "A Chapter Called Children of Bodom", took place at the Helsinki Ice Hall, Finland. The statement said: 

It was later reported that the main reason for the departures was that Raatikainen, Seppälä and Wirman could no longer find a shared viewpoint with Laiho. Laiho and Freyberg found a new bassist and a new drummer according to Helsingin Sanomat. According to Finnish music zine Soundi, Laiho could not use the band's name without permission from his former bandmates.

Bodom After Midnight and death of Alexi Laiho (2020–2021) 

In 2020, Laiho decided to carry on with Freyberg in their new band Bodom After Midnight. Joining them were bassist Mitja Toivonen (ex-Santa Cruz), drummer Waltteri Väyrynen (Paradise Lost) and touring keyboardist Lauri Salomaa. The band made a live debut on 23 October 2020 in Seinäjoki, Finland with two more shows at Tavastia in Helsinki, Finland, where the band played an hour-long set of Children of Bodom songs.

On 4 January 2021, it was announced that Alexi Laiho had died in late December 2020 from health complications at the age of 41. Bodom After Midnight was in the process of working on its full-length debut album, and before his death, recorded three songs and shot a music video, which were announced to be released posthumously. On 10 February, the band announced the release of an EP titled Paint the Sky with Blood, which was released on 23 April 2021. The 3-song EP features the final recordings by Laiho, consisting of two original songs and a Dissection cover. Guitarist Daniel Freyberg stated that there would be no more releases: "There was no more songs written. That was all the songs, all the riffs Alexi ever presented us. So there's no leftovers."

In an April 2021 interview with Loudwire, Freyberg stated that Bodom After Midnight would not continue without Laiho: "Unfortunately, Bodom After Midnight as an active band is pretty much going to be buried with Alexi. We don't really feel comfortable using the name Bodom without Alexi, because it's so connected to him."

Their song "Paint the Sky With Blood" was elected by Loudwire as the 8th best metal song of 2021.

Musical style and influences

Children of Bodom has been described usually as melodic death metal and power metal, combining the two genres together. Influences and inspirations to Children of Bodom were cited as a variety of artists such as Anthrax, Cannibal Corpse, Dimmu Borgir, Dire Straits, Entombed, Paul Gilbert, Guns N' Roses, Helloween, Hypocrisy, Billy Idol, In Flames, Iron Maiden, Kreator, Yngwie Malmsteen, Metallica, Mötley Crüe, Nine Inch Nails, Obituary, Ozzy Osbourne, Pantera, Poison, the Ramones, Sepultura, the Sex Pistols, Skid Row, Slayer, Stone, Suicidal Tendencies, Twisted Sister, Steve Vai and W.A.S.P.

Laiho has been, according to AllMusic, "widely celebrated as one of the genre's most accomplished players", while the band has an "instantly recognizable sound".

Tributes
In 2022, a restaurant bar dedicated to the band called Bodom Bar & Sauna was opened in Espoo, located next to the Niittykumpu metro station. As the name suggests, the bar also includes a public sauna.

Band members
Final lineup
 Alexi Laiho – lead guitar, lead vocals (1993–2019), bass (1993–1994, 1995–1996), keyboards (1993–1996, 2019), rhythm guitar (1993–1996, 2003, 2015) (died 2020)
 Jaska Raatikainen – drums (1993–2019), keyboards (1993–1996)
 Henkka Seppälä – bass, backing vocals (1995–2019)
 Janne Wirman – keyboards, backing vocals (1997–2019)
 Daniel Freyberg – rhythm guitar, backing vocals (2016–2019)

Bodom After Midnight lineup (2020–2021)
 Alexi Laiho – lead guitar, lead vocals (died 2020)
 Daniel Freyberg – rhythm guitar, backing vocals
 Mitja Toivonen – bass, backing vocals
 Waltteri Väyrynen – drums
 Lauri Salomaa – keyboards, backing vocals (live member)

Former members
 Samuli Miettinen – bass, backing vocals (1994–1995)
 Jani Pirisjoki – keyboards, backing vocals (1994–1997), rhythm guitar (1994–1995)
 Alexander Kuoppala – rhythm guitar, backing vocals (1995–2003)
 Roope Latvala – rhythm guitar, backing vocals (2004–2015; live member 2003–2004)

Former live members
 Erna Siikavirta – keyboards (1998)
 Kimberly Goss – keyboards, backing vocals (1998)
 Netta Skog – accordion (guest 2015, 2016)
 Antti Wirman – rhythm guitar, backing vocals (2015)

Timeline

Discography

 Something Wild (1997)
 Hatebreeder (1999)
 Follow the Reaper (2000)
 Hate Crew Deathroll (2003)
 Are You Dead Yet? (2005)
 Blooddrunk (2008)

 Relentless Reckless Forever (2011)
 Halo of Blood (2013)
 I Worship Chaos (2015)
 Hexed (2019)

See also
 List of best-selling music artists in Finland

References

External links

 
1993 establishments in Finland
2019 disestablishments in Finland
Century Media Records artists
Finnish melodic death metal musical groups
Finnish power metal musical groups
Musical groups established in 1993
Musical groups disestablished in 2019
Musical quintets
Nuclear Blast artists